Chmielniki may refer to the following places:
Chmielniki, Bydgoszcz County in Kuyavian-Pomeranian Voivodeship (north-central Poland)
Chmielniki, Kuyavian-Pomeranian Voivodeship (north-central Poland)
Chmielniki, Podlaskie Voivodeship (north-east Poland)